The 2010–11 Rugby Pro D2 was the season of the second-level French rugby union club competition, behind the Top 14, for the 2010–11 season. It runs alongside the 2010–11 Top 14 competition; both competitions are operated by the Ligue Nationale de Rugby (LNR).

Albi, who had become the first team to gain promotion back to the Top 14 only one year after being relegated in 2008, got immediately relegated again at the end of the previous Top 14 season. Bayonne finished second-to-bottom and were set to accompany Albi in Pro D2, but Montauban were revealed to have serious financial troubles and were relegated instead. A month later, the LNR's financial arm, DNACG, announced that Montauban would be further dropped to Fédérale 1, allowing Aix-en-Provence, who finished second-to-bottom in Pro D2, to stay. This meant that only the bottom finisher, Lannemezan, would be relegated to Fédérale 1 that year.
Carcassonne and Saint-Étienne, last year's Fédérale 1 two finalists, gained promotion to Pro D2 for the first time in their history, whilst Agen and La Rochelle, respectively champions and promotion play-offs winners, were promoted to the Top 14.

Lyon, who lost the promotion final the previous year, established themselves as a candidate for the title from early on in the season along with recently relegated Albi. But whilst Albi struggled to keep their momentum after the Christmas break, Lyon managed to maintain their winning ways and held on to their top spot until the end of the season despite a remarkable finish by Grenoble, who had missed on a semi-final spot because of an unfavourable head-to-head against Pau the previous year, and who came back from a poor start to finish within two points of Lyon, the smallest margin between the top two teams since the establishment of the Pro D2, and seven points clear of Albi. In the promotion semi-finals, Albi saw off Mont-de-Marsan after extra time, while Grenoble couldn't capitalise on their home ground advantage and fell to fifth-placed Bordeaux-Bègles. In the final, Bordeaux-Bègles defeated Albi 21–14 to reach the Top 14 for the first time since Bordeaux and Bègles merged to form a new club in 2006.

The previous year's two losing semi-finalists, Oyonnax and Pau, both had disappointing seasons, finishing eighth and ninth, respectively. The two newly promoted teams, Carcassonne and Saint-Étienne, fared very differently. While Carcassonne enjoyed a very successful season, to the point that they looked like a credible candidate for the promotion playoffs for the first half of the season, ultimately finishing in tenth, Saint-Étienne had a nightmarish season, with a single win, one draw and twenty-eight losses, amounting to 17 points, the poorest-ever record in the Pro D2 (Lannemezan had finished with 19 points the previous year).
Aix-en-Provence, who had been reprieved the previous year, looked like they were going to be part of a three-way battle with Dax and Colomiers to avoid the second relegation spot, but a string of victories in the second half of the season ensured that they would stay in Pro D2 for at least a third consecutive year. Dax and Colomiers fought until the last day, both finishing with 55 points, but a better head-to-head allowed Dax to clinch the coveted 14th spot, and sent Colomiers to Fédérale 1.

Previous season

Agen, who had been a favorite for promotion ever since they were relegated at the end of the 2006–07 season, finally lived up to the expectations and dominated the championship from the start, finishing with an 11-point margin over second-placed Lyon and thus earning promotion to the 2010–11 Top 14 season. Lyon and La Rochelle made the most of the home ground advantage to qualify for the promotion final with victories over Pau and Oyonnax, respectively, and faced each other in the final. La Rochelle, despite having lost both confrontations against Lyon during the regular season, triumphed 32–26 and earned the right to accompany Agen in the Top 14 after eight years spent in Pro D2.

The two newly promoted teams, Aix-en-Provence and Lannemezan, were not able to rival the other teams and from early on in the season occupied the bottom two places that they were to keep until the end. Lannemezan in particular finished with only three wins out of thirty games (one of which against arch-rivals Tarbes), amounting to 19 points, the poorest record in the Pro D2 since the introduction of the bonus points.

However, in a new twist of events, Montauban, who were already relegated to Pro D2 for financial reasons (thus saving Bayonne's spot in the Top 14), failed their audit on June 10, and were further relegated to Fédérale 1. Their decision not to appeal the DNACG's ruling also meant that Aix would be reprieved and compete again in Pro D2 for the next year.

Competition format
The top team at the end of the regular season (after all the teams played one another twice, once at home, once away), is declared champion and earns a spot in the next Top 14 season. Teams ranked second to fifth compete in promotion playoffs, with the semifinals being played at the home ground of the higher-ranked team. The final is then played on neutral ground, and the winner earned the second ticket to the next Top 14.

The LNR uses a slightly different bonus points system from that used in most other rugby competitions. It trialled a new system in 2007–08 explicitly designed to prevent a losing team from earning more than one bonus point in a match, a system that also made it impossible for either team to earn a bonus point in a drawn match. LNR chose to continue with this system for subsequent seasons.

France's bonus point system operates as follows:

 4 points for a win.
 2 points for a draw.
 1 "bonus" point for winning while scoring at least 3 more tries than the opponent. This replaces the standard bonus point for scoring 4 tries regardless of the match result.
 1 "bonus" point for losing by 7 points (or less).

Season table

{| class="wikitable" width="450px" style="float:left; font-size:95%; margin-left:15px;"
| colspan="2"  style="text-align:center; background:#fff;" cellpadding="0" cellspacing="0"|Key to colors
|-
| style="background: #3fff00;" |     
|Champions automatically promoted to Top 14
|-
| style="background: #fde910;" |     
|Winner of playoffs between second- through fifth-place teams for the second promotion place
|-
| style="background:#ccf;"|     
|Remaining participants in promotion playoffs
|-
| style="background: #ff79B4;" |     
|Bottom two teams relegated to Fédérale 1
|}

Results

Key
The score of the game is given by the middle (third and fourth) columns. The first and last columns indicate the number of tries scored by the home and the away team, respectively. A blue border indicates that the team has earned an attacking bonus point (i.e. has scored at least three more tries than its opponent), a yellow one that the team has earned a defensive bonus point (defeat by 7 points or less). If a team earns both bonus points, this will be indicated by a green border.

Promotion playoffs
All times CEST.

Semi-finals

Final

Individual statistics

Top points scorers

Top try scorers

See also
 2010–11 Top 14 season

Notes and references

External links
  Ligue Nationale de Rugby – Official website
  Midi Olympique
  Match Attd

2010-11
Pro D2